"Higher Plane" is the name of a hit song by R&B/funk band Kool & the Gang and written by Robert Earl Bell, Ronald Nathan Bell, George Melvin Brown, Robert Spike Mickens, Claydes Charles Smith, Dennis Thomas and
Rick Westfield.  From the album Light of Worlds, the single spent one week at number one on the R&B singles chart in October, 1974.  It also peaked at number 37 on the Billboard Hot 100 singles chart. The song was included on the 1975 Kool & the Gang Greatest Hits! record.

Record World said that it has an "elevated dance groove."

Track listing

De-Lite Records – DE-1562:

References

1974 singles
Kool & the Gang songs
1974 songs
Songs written by Ronald Bell (musician)
Songs written by Claydes Charles Smith
Songs written by Robert "Kool" Bell